Neopolitan is the 1991 debut album by Odds. It is named for the flavour of ice cream; although intentionally a misspelling (the ice cream flavour is actually spelled neapolitan), "neopolitan" is the spelling that appears on the album cover. Members of the band have stated that the album title was intentionally misspelled in order to see if anyone would pick up on their cunning. "Neo"-new, "politan"- people. New People.

The first two hits were "Love is the Subject" and "King of the Heap". Third single "Wendy Under the Stars" featured the controversial refrain "I was fucking Wendy under the stars/The night that Elvis died". A true story." An edited version of the song, with the lyric changed to "I made love to Wendy", was released to radio.

Track listing
All songs written by Craig Northey, Steven Drake, Paul Brennan and Doug Elliott.

 "King of the Heap" (4:58)
 "No Warning" (3:31)
 "Are You Listening?" (1:44)
 "Evolution Time" (4:35)
 "Eternal Ecstasy" (3:53)
 "Family Tree" (3:56)
 "Wendy Under the Stars" (4:14)
 "Truth or Dare" (3:41)
 "Love Is the Subject" (4:45)
 "Trees" (2:51)
 "Domesticated Blind" (3:25)
 "Big White Wall" (4:15)
 "Horsehead Nebula" (2:08)

References

1991 debut albums
Odds (band) albums
Zoo Entertainment (record label) albums